Ioana Cristina Rotaru ( Papuc, 4 January 1984) is a Romanian rower. She competed at the 2008 Summer Olympics, where she won a bronze medal in women's eight. At the 2004 Summer Olympics she won a gold medal at the same discipline.  At the 2012 Summer Olympics, she was part of the Romanian team that finished 4th.

References 
 
 

1984 births
Living people
Romanian female rowers
Olympic gold medalists for Romania
Olympic bronze medalists for Romania
Olympic rowers of Romania
Rowers at the 2004 Summer Olympics
Rowers at the 2008 Summer Olympics
Rowers at the 2012 Summer Olympics
Olympic medalists in rowing
Medalists at the 2008 Summer Olympics
Medalists at the 2004 Summer Olympics
World Rowing Championships medalists for Romania
European Rowing Championships medalists